Ahmad Al Harthy (born 31 August 1981 in Muscat, Oman) is an Omani racing driver. He won the 2012 Porsche Carrera Cup Great Britain Pro-Am 1 Championship and in 2017 became the Blancpain Endurance Cup Pro-Am Champion along with British team-mate Jonny Adam.

Career

Early years 
Although dabbling with karting at the age of seven, following a visit with his older brother to his local kart track in Oman, it wasn't until Al Harthy reached his early 20s that he was able to set-out on the path to a career in motorsport.

His first car racing experience came in 2006 in the Bahrain based Thunder Arabia Championship where he broke new ground as the first Omani born driver to compete in single-seater (or formula) racing. Finishing the season as Vice-Champion with two race wins and 10 podiums from 14 races, Al Harthy sought a fresh challenge for the following year and decided to pit himself against the best competition in Britain in the Formula Renault BARC Championship.

Formula Renault BARC 

Joining the Hillspeed team at the start of 2007, Al Harthy went on to enjoy a successful three year stint with the squad. Improving steadily throughout his first season, in which he achieved his debut Formula Renault podiums in the end-of-year Winter Championship, he became a consistent front-runner in 2008. Concluding his second season in the category fifth overall, Al Harthy secured three podium finishes along the way and also qualified on pole position twice.

His final year of Formula Renault BARC action culminated very impressively and he finished the season Vice-Champion with six podiums to his credit and two fastest race laps. As it later transpired, the 2009 championship would be his last in single-seater racing before switching his attention to the world of sportscar competition.

During 2009 though, Al Harthy also made his debut in the Chevrolet Supercars Middle East Championship in the headline SC09 Class where he piloted a Chevrolet Lumina during the Formula One Grand Prix support race at Sakhir in Bahrain. He achieved one podium finish from the two races contested.

Porsche Carrera Cup GB Championship 
For the 2010 motor racing season, Al Harthy chose to move into the ultra-competitive world of sportscar racing by signing to race for the Redline Racing team in the Porsche Carrera Cup Great Britain Championship – a support category to the UK's biggest motor racing series, the Dunlop MSA British Touring Car Championship. Easily the most high profile year of action of his career at that point, Al Harthy adapted quickly to the new discipline and became a regular podium contender in the Pro-Am 1 Class of the prestigious championship.

Making six visits to the rostrum over the course of the season, he ended the year fourth overall in the Pro-Am 1 Class driver standings and 11th overall in the main championship. Increasing his profile massively throughout the year, Al Harthy's success achieved notable exposure for his strong portfolio of homegrown sponsors.

One of Al Harthy's personal highlights of 2010 was his involvement in the Porsche Carrera Cup France support event to the legendary 24 Hours of Le Mans Race. Becoming the first Omani to ever compete at the world famous Circuit de la Sarthe, his participation was also notable for a further reason – the Porsche race marked the 40th anniversary of the marque's first 24 Hours of Le Mans victory and this coincided with the 40th anniversary of His Majesty Sultan Qaboos bin Said’s reign in Oman.

Al Harthy also made selected appearances in the Chevrolet Supercars ME Championship once again but several mechanical problems blunted his charge.

In 2011 Al Harthy returned to the Porsche Carrera Cup Great Britain Championship but prior to the start of the season he made headlines and history on the streets of his home city of Muscat by conducting passenger rides in a Porsche 911 GT3 race car. The carefully arranged event ran in conjunction with the support of the Royal Oman Police and the Oman Automobile Association.

Enjoying a highly successful year, Al Harthy once again competed with Redline Racing but with the team entry branded as the Oman Air Racing Team in deference to title sponsor Oman Air. His highly prestigious portfolio of commercial backers also included the Oman Ministry of Tourism, Ministry of Sports Affairs, the National Bank of Oman and Nawras.

Finishing his second season in the championship third overall in the Pro-Am 1 Class, Al Harthy took two wins and a total of 12 podiums. The championship included a visit to the notorious Nürburgring-Nordschleife and the Omani also made an outing in Porsche Carrera Cup France while also debuting in the Porsche Mobil 1 Supercup at Silverstone.

In November 2011, Al Harthy competed in the burgeoning Porsche GT3 Cup Challenge Middle East. From six races contested he chalked-up a tally of three podiums including a sensational lights-to-flag victory during the FIA Formula One World Championship support race at Yas Marina Circuit in Abu Dhabi. He also had the opportunity to compete in the UAE GT Championship where he won on his debut, driving a Porsche 911 GT3, partnering James Sutton.

On 21 February 2012 at a press conference in Muscat, Oman, Al Harthy announced his continued participation in Porsche Carrera Cup Great Britain for a third successive year. Retaining Oman Air as his title sponsor, the Oman Air Racing Team was once again fielded by Redline Racing. From the outset, Al Harthy was one of the favourites to win the Pro-Am 1 title and he did so in style after a remarkably successful season. Winning 12 races and taking a total of 17 Pro-Am 1 podiums from the 20 races contested, he also secured a string of fastest laps and class pole positions. Al Harthy also made his second career appearance in the Porsche Mobil 1 Supercup in 2012 during the FIA Formula One World Championship British Grand Prix weekend at Silverstone. An unfortunate puncture resulted in retirement.

British GT Championship and Blancpain Endurance Cup 
In March 2013, Al Harthy and chief sponsor Oman Air announced a move from 'sprint' racing into 'endurance' competition after confirming a deal to graduate into the Avon Tyres British GT Championship with the Motorbase Performance team. Partnered by reigning British GT Champion Michael Caine, the duo ran under the Oman Air Motorbase banner in a Porsche 997 GT3-R. Al Harthy went on to end his maiden endurance racing campaign an impressive fifth in the championship - he and Caine claimed two race victories along the way, round five at Snetterton Motor Racing Circuit and round eight at Circuit Park Zandvoort in the Netherlands.

Al Harthy also had the opportunity in 2013 to dovetail his British GT season with a campaign in the pan-European Blancpain Endurance Series, also at the wheel of a Porsche 997 GT3-R but with the Slovakian ARC Bratislava squad in the GTR Class. Partnering team owner Miro Konopka, and running with headline sponsorship from the National Bank of Oman, Al Harthy achieved one class victory during the five-round season at Silverstone Circuit in June.

Al Harthy remained with Motorbase Performance for the 2014 season, racing an Aston Martin Vantage GT3 alongside Michael Caine in the British GT Championship and with Caine and Stephen Jelley in the Blancpain Endurance Series. In the British series Al Harthy and Caine became Vice-Champions with two victories, at Oulton Park and Silverstone, and two other podium finishes. The Omani then reunited with Porsche for the 2014/2015 Porsche GT3 Cup Challenge Middle East.

For the main 2015 motorsport season, he again combined British GT and Blancpain Endurance Series campaigns with the Motorbase-engineered Oman Racing Team and once again mounted a front-running challenge with the Aston Martin Vantage GT3 - taking a maiden outright top 10 finish in Blancpain during the season finale at the Nurburgring in Germany. At the end of the year, Al Harthy made his maiden appearance in the Gulf 12 Hours at Yas Marina Circuit in Abu Dhabi with the Oman Racing Team. Partnered by Jonny Adam and Darren Turner, the trio scorched to a fantastic podium finish.

Sticking with the trusty Aston Martin Vantage GT3 for 2016, Al Harthy - along with Adam - focused exclusively on the re-branded Blancpain Endurance Cup. For the longer races, requiring more than two drivers per entry, British driver Devon Modell joined the Oman Racing regulars. Ending the season fourth in the Pro-Am championship, the season highlight was undoubtedly the maiden Pro-Am podium finish achieved during round two at Silverstone Grand Prix Circuit with other major results including seventh in Pro-Am at the world renowned Total 24 Hours of Spa.

Celebrating the 10th anniversary of 'Oman Racing' in 2017, Al Harthy continued his increasingly strong partnership with Adam but with the engineering of the Aston Martin transferring to British squad TF Sport, headed by ex-racer Tom Ferrier. Beginning the Blancpain Endurance Cup season perfectly with their first Pro-Am victory at Monza in Italy, Al Harthy and Adam finished second in Pro-Am in round two at Silverstone, second again at Paul Ricard in France - where they were joined by Turkish racer Salih Yoluc - and then claimed a magnificent runner-up spot in Pro-Am during July's Total 24 Hours of Spa.

Winning the coveted Pro-Am title with a round to spare, and continuing the squad's 100% podium finishing record for the season, Al Harthy and Adam were again joined by Yoluc for the twice-round-the-clock challenge along with British driver Euan Hankey.

During a break in the Blancpain calendar mid-season, Al Harthy was joined by young British racer Tom Jackson for the prestigious Michelin Le Mans Cup races at the Circuit de la Sarthe in Le Mans, France, which run as part of the support package to the world renowned Le Mans 24 Hours. Winning the GTE class of both contests, which also featured LMP3 'prototype' cars, the Oman Racing duo delivered highly impressive performances in the two 55-minute races.

Racing record

Complete British GT Championship results 
(key) (Races in bold indicate pole position) (Races in italics indicate fastest lap)

† As Al Harthy was a guest driver, he was ineligible to score points.

Complete European Le Mans Series results
(key) (Races in bold indicate pole position; results in italics indicate fastest lap)

Complete FIA World Endurance Championship results
(key) (Races in bold indicate pole position; races in italics indicate fastest lap)

* Season still in progress.

References

External links 
 
 

1981 births
Living people
Omani racing drivers
Formula Renault BARC drivers
Porsche Supercup drivers
British GT Championship drivers
Blancpain Endurance Series drivers
24 Hours of Spa drivers
Porsche Carrera Cup GB drivers
People from Muscat, Oman
24H Series drivers
Aston Martin Racing drivers
Le Mans Cup drivers
Asian Le Mans Series drivers
FIA World Endurance Championship drivers